In Greek mythology, Demoleus or Demoleos was an Achaean warrior who participated in the Trojan War.

Mythology 
During the siege of Troy, Demoleus was slain by the hero Aeneas.Aeneas gave a smooth-linked golden corselet, triple-chained, of which his own victorious hand despoiled Demoleos, by the swift, embattled stream of Simois, under Troy,—and bade it be a glory and defence on valor's field; scarce might the straining shoulders of two slaves, Phegeus and Sagaris, the load endure, yet oft Demoleos in this armor dressed charged down full speed on routed hosts of Troy.

Note

References 

 Publius Vergilius Maro, Aeneid. Theodore C. Williams. trans. Boston. Houghton Mifflin Co. 1910. Online version at the Perseus Digital Library.
 Publius Vergilius Maro, Bucolics, Aeneid, and Georgics. J. B. Greenough. Boston. Ginn & Co. 1900. Latin text available at the Perseus Digital Library.

Achaeans (Homer)